The 1986 Reading Borough Council election was held on 8 May 1986, at the same time as other local elections across England and Scotland. One third of Reading Borough Council's 45 seats were up for election.

The election saw the Conservatives lose their majority on the council. Labour gained most seats, but remained one seat short of an overall majority, leaving the council with no overall control. After the election, Labour had 22 seats, the Conservatives had 18 seats, and the SDP-Liberal Alliance had 5 seats, all of whom were Liberals.

Labour subsequently took control of the council, with the support of two disaffected Conservatives. The Labour leader, Mike Orton, took the council's top political job as chair of the policy committee. The Conservative leader, Deryck Morton, stood down as party leader immediately after the election, being replaced by Geoff Canning. The Liberal leader remained Jim Day. Turnout was reported to be 39%.

Results

Ward results
The results in each ward were as follows (candidates with an asterisk* were the previous incumbent standing for re-election, candidates with a dagger(†) were sitting councillors contesting different wards):

By-elections 19861987

The Peppard ward by-election in 1986 was triggered by the resignation of Conservative councillor Geoff Lowe.

References

1986 English local elections
1986